Jenny Lovell is an Australian theatre, television and film actress, and drama teacher, probably best known for her stint as Jenny Hartley in 44 episodes in the television series Prisoner. She is the daughter of Sydney actor and  producer Nigel Lovell and actor and producer Patricia Lovell. 
 
Lovell made her film debut in Picnic at Hanging Rock in 1975 and also appeared in the film Gallipoli, small screen appearances including four episodes of the soap opera A Country Practice and the police drama Blue Heelers, and a role in the horror film Darkness Falls (2003). Lovell has performed internationally including at The Globe Theatre, London.

Lovell was the inaugural General Manager of Impro Melbourne, an improvisational theatre (improv) company founded in 1996 in Melbourne, Australia. During her time with the company, Lovell produced, directed and starred in various improv formats, including many seasons of competition in Theatresports, when it was hosted at the Theatre Works independent theatre in St Kilda, Melbourne.

Filmography

References

External links
 

Australian film actresses
Australian soap opera actresses
Australian stage actresses
Living people
Year of birth missing (living people)
20th-century Australian actresses
21st-century Australian actresses